Manpreet Juneja (born 12 September 1990) is an Indian cricketer who plays for Gujarat in domestic cricket. He is a right-handed middle-order batsman. Juneja scored an unbeaten 201 on his first-class debut against Tamil Nadu in December 2011, becoming only the fourth Indian to score a double-century on first-class debut. T. A. Sekhar, the mentor of IPL franchise Delhi Daredevils, was said to have been tracking Juneja even before his debut and drafted him into the Daredevils squad in January 2012.

Juneja scored 796 runs from 8 matches at an average of 66.33 in the 2012-13 Ranji Trophy. He had three centuries and three fifties to his name in the season.

In 2013 he along with Abdulahad Malek set the highest ever 4th wicket partnership in any forms of T20 cricket(202*)

Juneja made his IPL debut in 2013 (2013 Indian Premier League) against Kolkata Knight Riders.

He was bought by Sunrisers Hyderabad at the 2014 IPL auction.

He was part of the Gujarat cricket team that won the Ranji Trophy in 2016-17 where he scored half centuries in both innings. Manpreet with skipper Parthiv Patel helped Gujarat beat defending champions Mumbai in the final in Indore. Gujarat had never reached the finals nor won a Ranji Trophy in over 66 years before that.

References

External links

1990 births
Living people
Indian cricketers
Cricketers from Ahmedabad
Delhi Capitals cricketers
West Zone cricketers
Sunrisers Hyderabad cricketers